William Acton was an English politician who was MP for an unknown constituency and a mayor of Newcastle-upon-Tyne. The son of the MP of the same name, whose career his was described by History of Parliament Online as similar to, his younger brother and nephew were both MPs named Laurence Acton.

References

Mayors of Newcastle upon Tyne
Members of the Parliament of England (pre-1707)